Polmacoxib (trade name Acelex) is a nonsteroidal anti-inflammatory drug (NSAID) used to treat osteoarthritis. It was developed as CG100649 and approved for use in South Korea in February 2015.  It inhibits the enzymes carbonic anhydrase and COX-2.
A study in healthy volunteers showed drug effects on urinary prostaglandin metabolites for both polmacoxib and celecoxib that suggest a similar cardiovascular risk profile. Further work by this group developed dose-exposure relationships of polmacoxib to guide clinical development strategies.

References 

Analgesics
Nonsteroidal anti-inflammatory drugs
COX-2 inhibitors
Sulfonamides
Experimental cancer drugs